The Isabella Thoburn College, formerly the Lucknow Women's College and often called informally IT College, is a college for women in Lucknow, India, named after its founder, Isabella Thoburn, the first woman American missionary of the Methodist Episcopal Church to sail in India 1869. The college was established in 1870 with just six girls on roll.

History
The origin of the college was in a school for girls opened by Isabella Thoburn on 18 April 1870 in one room in the city-centre bazaar of [ Lucknow]. There were then just six girls. By 1871, the school had expanded and moved to occupy a house named Lal Bagh, which had been lived in by the treasurer of the last Nawab of Awadh.

On 12 July 1886 Miss Thoburn's school was renamed as the Lucknow Women's College and began to teach Fine Arts classes under the supervision of the University of Calcutta. In 1894, this connection was abandoned in favour of a new one with Allahabad University. Following the death of Miss Thoburn in 1901, the College, still at Lal Bagh, was given its present name in her honour. In 1923, it moved to the Chand Bagh estate of almost 32 acres, where it has remained until the present day. Chand Bagh means "moon garden". The property was once a royal garden. After its affiliation to Lucknow University it found requisite support and guidance from Nirmal Chandra Chaturvedi, a renowned educationist and member of the university Executive Council.

The college's Principal Sarah Chakko (1905–1954) was the first woman president of the World Council of Churches.

Present day

The College is now affiliated to Lucknow University. The buildings it has developed on the Chand Bagh campus since the 1920s include student hostels, lecture rooms, laboratories, a library, a college chapel and a large hall. The college teaches five undergraduate courses, leading to the degrees of Bachelor of Arts (BA), Bachelor of Education (BEd), Bachelor of Science (BSc), Bachelor of Commerce (BCom), and Bachelor of Library and Information Science (BLISc). There are also postgraduate courses leading to the degrees of Master of Arts (MA), Master of Science(MSc), Master of Business Administration (MBA) and to a Postgraduate Diploma in Healthcare and Hospital Management (PGDHHM).

IT College, along with undergraduate  and post graduate courses also offered intermediate classes. Eventually a separate college for intermediate level students was formed within the IT College campus. This building only houses classes for classes 11th and 12th, while the college level students study in the old college building.

IT College, as it is called has hostel facilities for students as well as has a large number of day scholars. There are three hostels for the resident students, Naunihal, Nishat Mahal and Maitreyi Bhawan.

On 12 April 2012 the Government of India issued a new five rupee postage stamp illustrating the College.

Principals
Isabella Thoburn
Sarah Chakko
Dr. Eva Shipstone
Dr. Kamala D. Edwards
Ms. Mary Abraham
Dr. Adella Paul
Dr. E. S. Charles 
Dr. Primrose H. Bodhan
Mrs. K. Sen
Dr. Vinita Prakash (Present)

Notable alumnae

Nabia Abbott (31 January 1897 – 15 October 1981), Islamic scholar, papyrologist, paleographer at the University of Chicago Oriental Institute
Lilavati Singh (December 14, 1868 – May 9, 1909), educator, also taught at the college
Martha Chen (born 1944), American academic, lecturer in public policy at the Harvard Kennedy School
Rashid Jahan (1905–1952), Urdu Writer.
Isha Basant Joshi (born 1908), first female officer of the Indian Administrative Service and writer, also known by the pen name Easha Joshi
Attia Hosain (1913–1998), feminist author and broadcaster
Ismat Chugtai  (August 1915 – 24 October 1991), eminent Indian writer in Urdu
Vijayaraje Scindia (1919–2001), politician, consort of the last ruling Maharaja of Gwalior
Qurratulain Hyder (1928–2007), novelist
Bina Rai (1936–2009), actress
Ma Prem Usha (1937-2008), clairvoyant and columnist
Fatima Zakaria (1936-2021), former editor of the Bombay Times and Sunday editor of The Times of India
Dr. Mohini Giri, first chairperson of National Commission for Women in India 
Vartika Singh, model, Femina Miss India Grand International finalist 2015, second Runner Up
Nivedita Bhattacharya, theatre and television actress
Aindrila Mukhopadhyay, Scientist and Division Lead at the Lawrence Berkeley National Laboratory

See also
Methodist High School, Kanpur

References

Further reading
Marjorie A. Dimmitt, Isabella Thoburn College: A Record from its Beginnings to its Diamond Jubilee (World Outlook Press, 1961)

Universities and colleges in Lucknow
Women's universities and colleges in Uttar Pradesh
Educational institutions established in 1870
1870 establishments in India